Funnies are terms used during a game of golf to describe various achievements, both positive and negative. They are different from traditional expressions such a birdie, eagle, etc. in that they do not necessarily refer to strict scores, but to unusual events which may happen in the course of a game. They are constantly being developed and there is some variation in their interpretation and usage throughout the world.

The main use of funnies is to add interest to informal matchplay games as they enable players to win something regardless of the overall outcome of the match.  They are frequently associated with gambling, with money, usually small stakes, changing hands depending on which funnies occur.

Types of Funny
The most common funnies and their usual meanings are:

Oozlum: If any person on the green in regulation (usually in one on a Par 3) has only one or two putts and so matches or beats par, they win. If more than one person succeeds, the funny goes to the one who was nearest the flag. If not won by anyone, this can be rolled over (i.e. pays out double) to the next Par 3, if this is what the players have agreed, and so on. Also called Ooozler or Oozelem.
Sandy: This is if you hole out for par (or less) having been in a bunker at some point during the hole. Also seen spelled "Sandie".
Ferret: The holing of a ball from off the green for a par or better or, in some alternative versions, when the player's score is still relevant to the outcome of that hole. Holing with a putter may be excluded.
Golden Ferret: The holing of a ball directly from a bunker.

These are all positive outcomes, resulting in a gain, either financial or simply in pride, for the successful player.

A negative funny is:
Plonker: If a man's drive fails to reach the ladies' tee, which is typically only a short distance in front of the men's tee.

Less common funnies:

Positive:
Sticky: If you hit the flag from off the green but didn't go in. An optimist would consider this good, a pessimist bad.
Chippy: If you chip straight in with the flag out. A Chippy Sticky refers to chipping in with the flag still in the hole.
Bonito: When a ball lands in the water but skips out back into play. Believed to be Australian. Also called a Barnes Wallis in the United Kingdom.
Bridgee: when you ricochet a ball off a bridge ( over water ) and score one under par ( birdie).

Negative:
Reverse Oozlum: Same as an Oozlum, but if you take three or more putts instead.
Reverse Sandy: Same as a Sandy but if you miss the putt for par.

Similar events
Other occurrences that are used for gambling:

Positive: 
Longest Drive: The longest drive of the group, but it must end up on the fairway.
Nearest the Pin: This is won by the player who is nearest the pin with his tee shot on a Par 3, so long as the ball finishes on the green.
Birdie: One under par (similarly, Eagle and Albatross). These can be gross or net, depending on the agreement at the start of play.
Bye: Once the game is over, a short match (often only one or two holes) can be played to give the loser a chance to regain some pride and possibly be bought a drink in the bar afterwards. Equivalent to a beer match in cricket if the main game finishes very early.
Hole in One: In view of how rarely this happens, it should pay out a very large amount; however, the normal result is that the successful player has to buy everyone in the bar a drink when they return to the clubhouse. Much glory but potentially costly.

Longest Drive and Nearest the Pin are most usually competed for by all of those taking part on Golf Society or corporate days with prizes for the winners.

Negative: 
Out of Turn: If you go out of turn at the start of a hole.

"Carry the Can" Funnies:

Rather like Atlas, who incorrectly was said to have been left supporting the world on his shoulders when someone passed it to him, there is a category of Funny which passes from one player to another rather than simply being won or lost as you go along. Each time it is passed, the fund is increased by one as in a skins game and the player left holding the funny at the end of the round pays out the amount it has accumulated to each of the other players.

Most common:
The Camel: Every time any player lands in a bunker, one point is added to the camel fund and this player then "carries" the camel until another player lands in a bunker. There is sometimes a division between the Camel for a fairway bunker and The Cat (or Caterpillar) if referring to a greenside bunker, but most would consider this to be an unnecessary complication.
The Snake: Every time any player takes three putts, one point is added to the snake fund and this player then "carries" the snake until another player three putts. In strict company, a four putt can be argued to be two snakes, and so on.

Less common:
The Fish (or Frog): Equivalent to a Camel but relating to water hazards rather than bunkers.
The Squirrel (or Monkey): Hit a tree. Some arguments arise whether the tree is just branches or includes foliage and whether bushes count. If in doubt assume everything counts. If it is thought that the ball must have hit a tree but all were unsighted and no sound was heard then the benefit of the doubt rests with the player.
The Gorilla (or Bear): If you hit your ball out of bounds.

Miscellaneous
Sally Gunnell: This refers to a shot which is not classically attractive, but which still goes quite a long way because it runs very well. It affectionately refers to the successful British athlete of the early 1990s.
Sister-in-law: This refers to a shot that finishes in a far better position than it should have.  For example, a Sally Gunnell that ends up a few feet from the hole could be called a Sister-in-law. (In other words, you're up there, but you really shouldn't be.)

See also
Golf glossary
Nassau (bet): a type of bet between golfers that is essentially three separate bets. Money is wagered on the best score in the front 9, back 9, and total 18 holes.
Skins game: a type of match play in which each hole has a set value, usually in money or points, that is awarded to the winner of a hole.  If any participants tie on a hole, the prize is rolled over to the subsequent hole.

Notes and references

Golf terminology
Wagering